Urmilla Kanetkar Kothare is an Indian actress in Marathi cinema and television. She is known for her roles in the Marathi films Duniyadari, Shubha Mangal Saavadhan, Ti Saddhya Kay Karte and Hindi TV serials Maayka and Mera Sasural and the Marathi serials Asambhav, Uun Paus and Goshta Eka Lagnachi. She is a classical dancer and made her Telugu cinema debut in 2014 with Welcome Obama.

Personal life
Urmilla and Adinath Kothare both meet each other in 2006 where they team up for Marathi film Shubha Mangal Saavdhaan. In 2011, they both get married. In 2018, The couple welcoming their first baby daughter named Jija Kothare.

Career
Born in Pune, Kanetkar is a trained kathak dancer, and has a Master of Arts degree in it. She has taken lessons in Bhubaneshwar from Sujata Mahapatra for Odissi as well. In 1997, she participated in the program held for Fiftieth Independence Day Celebrations for India. She earned a BA degree from the St. Xavier's College, Mumbai.

Shubh Mangal Savdhan was her debut film and Tujhya Veena her debut TV series. Aai Shappath..! and Savalee were her next films. She worked with veteran actress Reema Lagoo in these three movies. Additionally, during her debut movie she also met Adinath Kothare. He was an assistant director in that movie. They got married in 2011.

Filmography

Television

Awards

Zee Marathi awards
Nominated
 Best Actress Award 2007. Role: Shubhra/Parvati (Asambhav)
 Best Actress Award 2008. Role: Shubhra/Parvati (Asambhav)

References

External links
 

1986 births
Living people
21st-century Indian actresses
Actresses in Hindi television
Actresses in Marathi cinema
Actresses from Pune
Marathi people